The Croats, also known as Cravats or Crabats, were 17th-century light cavalry forces in Central Europe, comparable to the hussars. 
The Croats were initially irregular units loosely organized in bands. The first regular Croat regiment was established in 1625. 

The most notable engagement of the Croats was their participation on the side of the Catholic League in the Thirty Years' War. 
At the height of the Thirty Years' War, as many as 20,000 Croatian cavalry were in the service of the  Imperial Army, including the majority of Wallenstein's harquebusiers.

Initial structure 
The Croats were initially recruited by generals of the Habsburg monarchy. The soldiers who joined Croats signed contracts which expired after the military campaign would be over, most often for any booty and sometimes for a fee. At the beginning, their bands were loosely organized. They were dismissed after the military campaign was finished and returned in the spring to be recruited by their old commanders.

In 1623 the size of the Croat units under command of Count of Tilly was reduced from 172 hearths to 72. They participated in the 1623 Battle of Stadtlohn under Tilly's command.
Denmark hired in Croat troops during both the Swedish Wars (1657-1660) and the Scanian War (1676-79). During the Scanian War they were led by Disznoldt and lodged in the heavily fortified town of Landskrona in Scania where they caused quite a lot of trouble and were picky about their lodgings. They were sent on 'small war' missions together with the native friskytter corps and several of them were killed in battle.

Establishment of the regular units 
The first regular Croat regiment was established in 1625 by Hector Ludwig Isolani, a military officer in service of Albrecht von Wallenstein.

They were engaged to confuse the enemy flanks by attacking their wings. In many historical works the Croats are criticized for their cruel methods. It has been reported that the worst atrocities during the Sack of Magdeburg were committed by the Croats and Walloons. By the end of 1633 the Croats began their service in the army of the Kingdom of France.

Equipment and uniform 

The Croats wore hats made of fur and long red cloaks. Their primary arms were carbines. Besides carbine the Croat arms included two pistols. The Croats wore scarves around their necks, probably for hygienic purposes. During the Thirty Years' War the Croats came in contact with French who were impressed by their outfit and soon adopted the scarf, naming it after the Croats, cravat , which evolved into the modern-day cravat and necktie. The Cravat Regiment is a guard of honour established in 2010 in Zagreb, Croatia, which wears uniforms that are replicas of those worn by the Croats.

Legacy 
The influence of the Croat military unit was so strong that between 1631 and 1638 similar units were established in Bavaria, Spain and France. At the beginning of the 20th century mothers still scared their children with tales about the 1631 Sack of Magdeburg in which Croats took part. The population of eastern France compared all invasions after the Thirty Years' War with stories about Croats and Swedes who ravaged their territory in the 1630s.

References

Sources 

 
 
 
 
 
 
 
 
 
 
 
 
 
 
 

Military units and formations of the Early Modern period
Thirty Years' War
Military history of Croatia
Cavalry units and formations
17th-century military history of Croatia